Foersterella is a genus of insects belonging to the family Tetracampidae.

The species of this genus are found in Europe.

Species:
 Foersterella angusticornis Hansson, 2016 
 Foersterella anupama Narendran, 2000

References

Tetracampidae
Hymenoptera genera